Nidahas Trophy is an international cricket tournament held in Sri Lanka. The tournament is held to celebrate the independence of the Asian island country Sri Lanka.  
The tournament is not a regular event in the calendar with the previous tournaments having a gap of 20 years in between. Each of the three participating teams play each other twice and the top two progress to the final. In March 2017 Sri Lanka Cricket announced that the 2018  tournament would be played in the newer and shorter T20I format with Bangladesh entering the tournament, replacing the only Non-Asian team in the triple-nation New Zealand.

Tournament history
Both the tournaments have been won by India, defeating Sri Lanka in the final of the 1998 tournament and Bangladesh in the final of the 2018 tournament.

Results summary

The table below provides an overview of the performances of teams over past Nidahas Trophy tournaments.

Teams Performances

Debut of teams

References

One Day International cricket competitions
Twenty20 International cricket competitions
Cricket in Asia
Recurring sporting events established in 1998